The 2008 Thai Premier League had 16 teams. It was the twelfth since its establishment. The first matches of the season were played on 18 February 2008, and the season ended on 11 October 2008. Three teams would be relegated to Thailand Division 1 League. The Champion in this season would qualify for the AFC Champions League 2009 qualification stage and the runner-up would be enter the AFC Cup 2009. The official name of the league at this time was Thailand Premier League.

Provincial Electricity Authority won their first championship after they changed their home stadium from Bangkok to Ayutthaya, where they have a bigger fan base. This season also saw the great successful team of Thai football league, Bangkok Bank relegated to Division 1 league after they were defeated by Chonburi in the final match of the season.

Defending champions Chonburi were pipped to the title after faltering against new Premier League side Samut Songkhram in the second to last game of the season. Samut finished in a creditable 7th place, one place above Chula United who also impressed in their first season back in the top flight.

Customs Department FC, the other newcomers along with, found life to difficult and dropped back into Division One at the first attempt.

Rules

Teams play each other twice on a home and away basis
3 Points for a win
1 Point for a draw
At end of the season the winners play the runners ups in the Kor Royal Cup
Winner qualifies for Asian Champions League Qualification Round
Runner-Up enters AFC Cup
Teams finishing on same points at the end of the season use head-to-head record to determine finishing position.
Bottom three teams are relegated to Thailand Division 1 League

Member clubs
Bangkok Bank
Bangkok University
BEC Tero Sasana
Chonburi
Chula-Sinthana † (promoted from Division 1 Winner Group B)
Coke-Bangpra (promoted from Division 1 Runner Up Group A)
Customs Department (promoted from Division 1 Winner Group A)
Krung Thai Bank
Nakhon Pathom
Osotsapa M-150
Port Authority of Thailand
PEA
Royal Thai Army
Samut Songkhram (promoted from Division 1 Runner Up Group B)
Thailand Tobacco Monopoly
TOT

† Chula-Sinthana  changed to "Chula United" from August 2008 season

Stadium and locations

Managerial changes

League table

Season notes
The Thai Premier League took a break between May 3 and June 28 due to national team world cup qualification matches in June
On the 17 May, a Thai Premier League XI beat an experimental Manchester City team 3-1, in a Friendly match.
It was announced this year that Thai clubs would no longer have direct entry into the Asian Champions League, they would have to play in a playoff match against other ASEAN members to enter the new format. Thai clubs would get one spot in the AFC Cup, potentially joined by another if unsuccessful in the playoff spot for the Champions League.
National coach Charnwit Polcheewin announced on the 16th June 2008, that he would resign as Thailand National team manager.
National team coach Charnwit Polcheewin formally resigned on June 25 after he failed to steer the national side to the fourth stage of World Cup qualification. Charnwit help the side win two King's Cup tournaments and runner up in the 2007 ASEAN Football Championship.
The National team failed to progress past the third stage of the World Cup Qualifying campaign. They overcame lowly Macau and Yemen in the earlier rounds, but came bottom of the four team group stage.
On July 1, 2008, the 2011 AFC Asian Cup qualification draw was made. Thailand got drawn into Group E with Iran, Jordan and ASEAN neighbours Singapore. Thailand were second seed in the draw process. The first matchday would be away to Jordan on January 14, 2009
Peter Reid was confirmed as the new national team coach on July 23. Earlier reports had suggested that Holger Osieck was also in the running, but pulled out to leave Reid as the sole candidate. Reid would start his new role on September 1.
On July 23, new national team coach Peter Reid was also put in charge on the Thailand national under-20 football team. Reid's first task was to prepare them for the forthcoming AFC Youth Championship to be played in Saudi Arabia in October 2008.
At the beginning of  August,  Chula-Sinthana changed their club name officially to "Chula United".
On August 27 Thailand were drawn in Group B of the 2008 AFF Suzuki Cup. Their opponents in the first round are; Vietnam, Malaysia and a qualifier from the Qualification phase.
On September 4 Thailand announced that their new national team colour would be Yellow, changing from the previous Red home kit. Blue would continue to be used as the second kit. Yellow represents the Monarch. The change of kit colour was approved by FIFA.
Customs Department were relegated to the Thailand Division 1 League on September 20.
Muang Thong NongJork United was promoted from Thailand Division 1 League on September 21.
Sriracha and Royal Thai Navy were promoted to the Premier League from Thailand Division 1 League on September 28.
Royal Thai Army were relegated to the Thailand Division 1 League on October 1 without kicking a ball, due to Port Authority of Thailand beating Bangkok University in a re-scheduled match.
PEA were crowned champions on October 11. Bangkok Bank FC were relegated to the Thailand Division 1 League on the same day
The national team came runners up to Vietnam in the 2008 AFF Suzuki Cup, losing 3-2 in the two match final.

Asian Representation
 Chonburi & Krung Thai Bank both took part in the 2008 AFC Champions League campaign. Both sides failed to make it out of their tough Group Stages. This was Chonburi's first season in Asian Competition.
Bangkok University and Thailand Tobacco Monopoly entered the Singapore Cup. Both teams made the Quarter-Final stage, where 'The Students' got beat by Young Lions 1-0 over two legs, conceding in the last minute of the first leg, whereas Thailand Tobacco Monopoly would get beat 4-2 on penalties by Woodlands Wellington.

Thai Premier League All-Star Exhibition game

Results

Top scorers

Annual awards

Coach of the Year
 Prapol Pongpanich - PEA

Goalkeeper of the Year
 Sinthaweechai Hathairattanakool - Chonburi

Defender of the Year
 Nattaporn Phanrit - Chonburi

Midfielder of the Year
 Narongchai Vachiraban - PEA

Striker of the Year
 Teeratep Winothai - BEC Tero Sasana

Young Player of the Year
 Ronnachai Rangsiyo - PEA

Top scorer
 Anon Sangsanoi - BEC Tero Sasana

Champions
The league champion was PEA. It was the team's first title.

See also
 2008 Thailand League Division 1
 2008 Thailand League Division 2
Thailand 2008 RSSSF

References

External links
Official Website

1
2008